Vinicius Romualdo dos Santos (born 22 March 2001), commonly known as Vini Paulista, is a Brazilian professional footballer who plays as a winger for Campeonato Brasileiro Série C club Oeste.

Club career

Grêmio
Born in Santa Bárbara d'Oeste, Vini Paulista joined the Grêmio's Academy at the age of 11 in 2012.

Career statistics

Club

Honours
Grêmio
Campeonato Gaúcho: 2021, 2022
Recopa Gaúcha: 2021

References

External links

Profile at the Grêmio F.B.P.A. website

2001 births
Living people
People from Santa Bárbara d'Oeste
Brazilian footballers
Association football forwards
Grêmio Foot-Ball Porto Alegrense players
Footballers from São Paulo (state)